Ivar Iversen (24 August 1914 – 19 August 2012) was a Norwegian sprint canoeist who competed from the late 1930s to the late 1940s. He won a gold medal in the K-1 4 x 500 m event at the 1948 ICF Canoe Sprint World Championships in London.

Iversen also competed at the 1936 Summer Olympics in Berlin, finishing eighth in the K-1 1000 m event.

Note that the K-1 4 x 500 m event was separate from the canoeing competitions at the 1948 Summer Olympics in London. The K-1 4 x 500 m event was only held once at the 1960 Games in Rome.

References

Ivar Iversen's profile at Sports Reference.com
Ivar Iversen's obituary

External links

1914 births
2012 deaths
Canoeists at the 1936 Summer Olympics
Norwegian male canoeists
Olympic canoeists of Norway
ICF Canoe Sprint World Championships medalists in kayak